Ethmia sabiella is a moth in the family Depressariidae. It is found in Mozambique and South Africa.

References

sabiella
Lepidoptera of Mozambique
Lepidoptera of South Africa
Moths of Sub-Saharan Africa
Moths described in 1875